Peñoles is a subsidiary company owned by Grupo BAL. Peñoles is the second largest Mexican mining company, the first Mexican producer of gold, zinc and lead and the world leader in silver production. Peñoles is a company with active mines within Mexico and with some prospection projects in South America. Holdings includes the Fresnillo Silver Mine / Mina Proaño, the Met-Mex Peñoles metallurgical complex and Química del Rey; a Chemical facility; three  operations. Other metals that the company produces are zinc, lead, copper, bismuth, and cadmium.

The main product of Peñoles is refined silver in the form of ingots and granulated silver which are 99.99% pure silver, this product is made in Torreón (northern Mexico) and from this location is exported all over the world.

In 2012, the company was awarded with the Fray International Sustainability Award for its initiatives in sustainable development. They approach sustainability by achieving three dimensions: Economics, Ecology, and Ethics, and by consistently measuring and analyzing their environmental impact.

History
Peñoles' history begins in 1887, with the mining concession of certain mines located within the Sierra de Peñoles in the state of Durango and the foundation of the Compañía Minera de Peñoles under the regime of President Porfirio Díaz.

From 1890 to 1960 the company suffered several mergers, fusions and acquisitions with others mining companies. During this time the company was owned by different shareholders, among them some from the United Kingdom, United States and Germany.

During the decade of 1960 to 1970 the Mexican mining industry was "mexicanized" and therefore Mr. Raúl Bailleres acquired the majority of the company shares, after that the company received the name of Industrias Peñoles.

Divisions
Peñoles has three mining related divisions and a branch created for other business. They are located mainly in northern México.

 Grupo Metalúrgico, located mainly in Torreón
 Grupo Minas-Químicos, scattered along northern Mexico
 Grupo Exploración, with several geological prospects all over the country and in South America
 Grupo Infraestructura, with a thermoelectric power facility and an important sharing in a drinking water service company.
 The company is also the controlling shareholder of Linea Coahuila Durango.

Grupo Metalúrgico
 Met-Mex Peñoles, zinc refinery that uses an electrolysis process
 Met-Mex Peñoles, lead-silver foundry
 Met-Mex Peñoles, lead-silver smelter and refinery
 Fertirey, sulphuric acid processor
 Met-Mex Peñoles, metallurgical specialities (Bermejillo, Durango)
 Aleazin, production of special alloys facility (zamak)

Grupo Minas-Químicos

 Unidad Fresnillo, the world richest silver mine located in Zacatecas
 Unidad Francisco I. Madero, a big zinc ore deposit also in Zacatecas
 Unidad Sabinas, located near the town of Sombrerete, Zacatecas
 Unidad La Ciénega, a gold mine located at the foothills of the Sierra Madre Occidental
 Unidad La Herradura, a gold mine in association with the American mining company Newmont Mining Corporation and an open pit mine located in Sonora
 Unidad Bismark, located near the Mexican–American border
 Unidad Naica, a big lead ore deposit, located in the state of Chihuahua
 Unidad Tizapa, a lead and zinc mine located in central Mexico (Zacazonapan, State of Mexico near Valle de Bravo recreational complex)
 Química del Rey, production of sodium sulfate and magnesium oxide.
 Magnelec, production of special magnesite chemical compounds

Grupo Exploración
 Milpillas Project, underground copper mine, located in the State of Sonora and with a future production of copper cathodes (2006)

Grupo Infraestructura
 TEP / Termoeléctrica Peñoles, is a pet coke fired thermoelectric power plant, focused in the own generation of electricity and located near Tamuin, San Luis Potosí. The excedents of power generation are sells to CFE.
 Drinking water service, a joint venture with the French company Ondeo which is concentrated in several Mexican urban sites like Cancún and México City.

References

External links
 

Non-renewable resource companies established in 1887
1887 establishments in Mexico
Companies based in Mexico City
Mining companies of Mexico
Gold mining companies of Mexico
Silver mining companies of Mexico
Porfiriato
Companies listed on the Mexican Stock Exchange
Metal companies of Mexico